The Cruces River is a river of Sabana Grande and San Germán in Puerto Rico.

See also
 
List of rivers of Puerto Rico

References

External links
 USGS Hydrologic Unit Map – Caribbean Region (1974)
Rios de Puerto Rico

Rivers of Puerto Rico